Rives-du-Loir-en-Anjou (literally Banks of the Loir in Anjou) is a commune in the Maine-et-Loire department in western France. It was established on 1 January 2019 by merger of the former communes of Villevêque (the seat) and Soucelles.

Population
The population data given in the table below refer to the commune in its geography as of January 2020.

See also
Communes of the Maine-et-Loire department

References

Communes of Maine-et-Loire